LIMS may refer to:

Technology 
Laboratory information management system, a software-based information management tool for laboratories
Laser ionization mass spectrometer, a laboratory device that uses a focused laser for microanalysis

Institutes and research centers 
La Trobe Institute for Molecular Science, an Australian research institute based at La Trobe University
Laban/Bartenieff Institute of Movement Studies, a non-profit institute involved in the training of certified Laban Movement Analysts
Lizard Island Research Station, an Australian coral reef research station
London Institute for Mathematical Sciences, a non-profit institute for physics and mathematics research

Other 
 Piacenza-San Damiano Air Base (ICAO airport code: LIMS) in Italy